New South governor is a term applied to various governors who led states in the Southern United States in the latter half of the twentieth century. Politically moderate, these governors were viewed as broadly progressive, avoiding racial rhetoric and advocating reform of government institutions.

History 
In the early twentieth century, the Southern United States was characterized by Jim Crow racial segregation, widespread voter disenfranchisement, malapportionment of state legislative districts, and dominance by a single political party. At this time, governors' offices in the South were generally weak, and officeholders tended to be either political elites or adventurers. The United States Supreme Court's ruling in the 1954 case Brown v. Board of Education, the increased activity of the civil rights movement, and the creation of civil rights legislation altered these political dynamics. The passage of the Voting Rights Act in 1965 enabled the massive growth of black voter registration and black political participation. As a result, black voters began to combine their electoral strength with white moderates to alter the outcomes of regional elections.

New South governors tended to avoid race-baiting campaigning or strong affirmations in favor of segregation. Their campaigns were also more modernized and media driven, and they tended to rely upon coalitions of moderate and liberal white voters and blacks. Terry Sanford was the first New South governor, being elected Governor of North Carolina in 1960. He emphasized peaceful race relations, improvements in education, and vigorous economic development. Carl Sanders of Georgia was elected in 1962. Several New South governors were elected in 1970: Reubin Askew in Florida, John C. West in South Carolina, Dale Bumpers in Arkansas, and Jimmy Carter in Georgia. Many national media outlets celebrated the election of these politicians as a sign of change and social progress in the region. Bumpers described these electoral outcomes as "a cry for new leadership in the South". All declared upon their inaugurations that they would avoid racial issues of the past, and in office they tended to ignore racially-charged issues, careful not to alienate white voters. Bill Waller won election in Mississippi in 1971.

By 1972, all Southern states except Alabama had elected a governor who espoused racially moderate rhetoric. Albert Brewer assumed the office of governor in Alabama in 1968 but was not elected, and was defeated in a electoral campaign for a full term in 1970. The victor, George Wallace ran a racially-charged campaign but won the primary runoff by a narrow margin and moderated his stance after taking office. A second group of New South governors were later elected, including Richard Riley of South Carolina, Bob Graham of Florida, George Busbee of Georgia, David Treen of Louisiana, William F. Winter of Mississippi, Lamar Alexander of Tennessee, Chuck Robb of Virginia, David Pryor and Bill Clinton of Arkansas, and James Holshouser, Jim Hunt, and James G. Martin of North Carolina. Many of these governors cited Sanford as an inspiration. Some of these governors sought national political influence, and two were elected President of the United States: Carter in 1976, and Clinton in 1992. Most New South governors were replaced by more conservative officeholders in the 1980s and 1990s.

Ideology and characteristics 
New South governors tended to be well-educated, sometimes having been educated outside of the South. In office, they were active executives and proponents of government reform, emphasizing executive leadership, efficiency, and honesty. Some supported new government services, but typically avoided large tax increases. The extent of reform they supported was generally limited to education, mental health services, and prisons. Most favored public investment in infrastructure, but not redistributionist programs. Many were economically conservative. New South governors also avoided racial rhetoric and took a moderate approach towards racial issues. These positions were guided by a desire to attract outside investment and strengthen professional workforces. They also tried to cultivate better relationships with the federal government than their predecessors, who had been more focused on states' rights.

References

Works cited 
  - Read online, registration required.
 
  - Link to profile at Google Books
 
 
  - Profile at Google Books

Politics of the Southern United States
History of the Southern United States
State governors of the United States